Remistus (died September 17, 456) was a general of the Western Roman Empire, commander-in-chief of the army under Emperor Avitus.

Life 
Remistus was a Visigoth, as shown by his Germanic name. In 456 Remistus reached a high military rank under Emperor Avitus, who probably appointed him magister militum, and received the rank of patricius: he was the first magister militum since the death of Aetius in 454 and the first barbarian magister militum.

The newly appointed general took up residence in Ravenna, the capital, with a group of Goths. That same year Avitus, who was opposed by the Roman Senate, decided to leave Italy and go to his native Gaul to gather reinforcements; Remistus remained back to control Italy. He clashed with the Senate army, led by the Italian magister militum Ricimer and was forced to return to Ravenna; besieged, he was captured and put to death in the Palace in Classis, just outside the city, on September 17.

The following month, Avitus was deposed and later died.

Bibliography 
 Fasti vindobonenses priores, 579; Auctarium Prosperi Havniense, 1.
 Theophanes the Confessor, AM 5948
 Jones, Arnold Hugh Martin, John Robert Martindale, John Morris, "Remistus", The Prosopography of the Later Roman Empire, volume 2, Cambridge University Press, p. 939.
 Mathisen, Ralph W., "Avitus (9/10 July 455 - 17/18 October 456)", De Imperatoribus Romanis

456 deaths
5th-century Visigothic people
5th-century Romans
Gothic warriors
Magistri militum
Patricii
Year of birth unknown
Romans from unknown gentes